Solomon Islands–Spain relations include the bilateral and diplomatic relations between these two countries. Solomon Islands does not have an embassy resident in Spain but maintains an honorary consulate in Madrid.

Historical relations 

In 1567, The Spanish explorer Álvaro de Mendaña de Neira left El Callao, Spain in search of  Terra Australis Incognita  to assess opportunities for colonisation and the exploitation of its resources. He took Pedro Sarmiento de Gamboa and Pedro de Ortega as captains of the two ships,  Los Reyes  and  Todos los Santos . On 7 February 1568 the ships arrived at the first of the islands encountered in  the Solomon Islands archipelago, naming it Santa Isabel de la Estrella (St. Elizabeth of the Star of Bethlehem in Spanish) and which is now Santa Isabel. Local exploration was led by Maestre de Campo, Pedro Ortega Valencia and Alférez Hernando Enríquez over six months exploring Palm Island now Malaita, San Jorge (south of Santa Isabel), Florecida, Galera, Buenavista, San Dimas, Nggela Sule, Guadalcanal, Sesarga (Savo), San Nicolás Islands, San Jerónimo and Arrecifes (group New Georgia ), San Marcos (Choiseul), San Cristóbal (Makira), Treguada (Ulawa), Tres Marías (Olu Malau Islands), San Juan ( Uki Ni Masi), San Urbán (Rennell), Santa Catalina and Santa Ana. 

Álvaro de Mendaña undertook a second expedition to the Solomon Islands archipelago to colonise them and to prevent them from serving as a refuge for English pirates then attacking Spanish ships trading with the Philippines. The expedition was authorised and sponsored by the Viceroy of Peru, García Hurtado de Mendoza who also contributed military personnel, while Mendaña himself convinced merchants and settlers to participate in the company. The expedition left El Callao in 1595, discovered the Marquesas Islands, named in honor of the viceroy and marquis of Cañete, and passed through the Cook Islands and Tuvalu, before arriving at Santa Cruz Islands in the south of the archipelago.
 
The ship  Santa Ysabel  was lost on the island of Tinakula in the Santa Cruz Islands however they founded a colony, Puerto de Santa Cruz, in what is now Temotu Province. Mendña soon became ill with malaria and the settlers came into conflict with the natives. On 18 October 1595 Mendaña died on the island of Nendö and his wife, Isabel de Barreto, took over the colony. After these events, they decided to leave the islands and go to Manila. 

After these expeditions Spain lost interest in the islands, although they continued to visit them during the 17th century. There was a new colonising attempt in 1606, led by Pedro Fernández de Quirós, who re-established the Mendaña colony, but abandoned it with the intention of discovering and exploring Australia, in which he was unsuccessful. The islands were subsequently visited by British, French and Dutch.

Diplomatic relations 
Spain established diplomatic relations with the nation state of Solomon Islands on 8 August 1980, but did not establish an embassy there but placed it under the jurisdiction of the Spanish Embassy in Canberra, Australia consular affairs managed by the Spanish consulate general in Sydney.

In 2013, Spain opened an honorary consulate in Honiara, reporting to the Spanish consulate in Sydney.

Relationship of visits in both directions 
In July 2013, a delegation from Guadalcanal attended the twinning ceremony between the island of Guadalcanal, Solomon Islands and Guadalcanal, Seville.

In August 2012, a Spanish Delegation met with representatives of Solomon Islands in the framework of the Pacific Islands Forum (PIF) in Rarotonga, Cook Islands, and made an economic contribution to the financing of the PIF Secretariat.

In May 2013, official Credentials Presentation trip by Ambassador Enrique Viguera.

In March 2014, official visit of the Director General of North America, Asia and Pacific and Maria Moset, of the General Secretariat of Fisheries, Sub-Directorate General of Regional Fisheries Agreements and Organizations, Ministry of Agriculture, Food and Environment Environment, to hold bilateral meetings.

See also 
 Foreign relations of Solomon Islands 
 Foreign relations of Spain

References 

 
Solomon Islands
Spain